Thierry Lubin (born 10 November 1970 in Saint-Claude, Guadeloupe) is a French sprinter who specializes in the 200 metres.

At the 1998 European Championships he won a silver medal in 4 x 100 metres relay with teammates Christophe Cheval, Frederic Krantz and Needy Guims. As the European champions Great Britain fielded their own World Cup team, the French relay team was selected to represent Europe at the 1998 IAAF World Cup, finishing sixth while Great Britain won the event.

Lubin had won the bronze medal in 200 m at the 1994 Jeux de la Francophonie. His personal best time was 20.55 seconds, achieved in August 1998 in La Chaux-de-Fonds.

International competitions

References

1970 births
Living people
French male sprinters
Guadeloupean male sprinters
French people of Guadeloupean descent
European Athletics Championships medalists
Mediterranean Games silver medalists for France
Mediterranean Games medalists in athletics
Athletes (track and field) at the 2001 Mediterranean Games